The Baojie Bridge is a historic stone arch bridge over the  in Binhu District of Wuxi, Jiangsu, China.

History
The originally bridge was built by Rong Desheng, a prominent industrialist from Wuxi, in 1934, during his 60th birthday.

In the 1990s, due to the development of Yuantouzhu Scenic Area, the China Central Television (CCTV) continued to build Tang Dynasty City, the Three Kingdoms City and Water Margin City as film and television bases in the south of Baojie Mountain, which attracted a large number of tourists and caused serious traffic congestion in Baojie Bridge. The opening ceremony was held on 16 October 1994. In December 2011, it was inscribed as a provincial key cultural unit by the Government of Jiangsu.

Gallery

References

Bridges in Jiangsu
Arch bridges in China
Bridges completed in 1994
Buildings and structures completed in 1994
1994 establishments in China